Mostarda di frutta  (sometime also called mostarda) is a Northern Italian condiment made of candied fruit and a mustard-flavoured syrup. Commercially the essential oil of mustard is employed, which has the advantage of transparency; in home cooking, mustard powder heated in white wine may be used.

More recently it has become a popular accompaniment to cheeses.

Variations 

 (also called  or ) is made from small, sour green apples called .

See also 

 List of mustard brands
 Specialty foods

References 

Italian cuisine
Mustard (condiment)
Cremona
Mantua
Cuisine of Lombardy